Strobisia is a genus of moth in the family Gelechiidae.

Species
 Strobisia argentifrons Walsingham, 1910
 Strobisia iridipennella Clemens, 1860
 Strobisia leucura (Walsingham, 1910)
 Strobisia proserpinella Frey & Boll, 1878
 Strobisia sapphiritis Meyrick, 1914
 Strobisia spintheropis Meyrick, 1922
 Strobisia stellaris (Felder & Rogenhofer, 1875)

References

 
Anacampsini